Richard Sass (1774 – 7 September 1849) (or Sasse) was an English landscape painter, etcher, and drawing master to royalty. He was the half brother of Henry Sass, the founder of Sass's Academy in London.

Sass exhibited at the Royal Academy in London from 1791 to 1813. He was appointed teacher in drawing to the Princess Charlotte, and later landscape painter to the Prince Regent. In 1825 he removed to Paris, where he spent the remainder of his life, altering his surname to "Sasse". He died there on 7 September 1849. He was survived by his wife Harriet (née Blake) who died in 1866, aged 76.

Sasse had some repute as a landscape-painter, especially in watercolours. In 1810 he published a series of etchings from picturesque scenery in Ireland, Scotland, and elsewhere.

References

External links
Richard Sasse on Artnet

18th-century English painters
English male painters
19th-century English painters
English watercolourists
English etchers
British landscape artists
British art teachers
1774 births
1849 deaths
19th-century English male artists
18th-century English male artists